The Lesbian, Gay, Bisexual & Transgender Community Center (formerly Lesbian and Gay Community Services Center), commonly called The Center, is a nonprofit organization serving the lesbian, gay, bisexual and transgender (LGBT) population of New York City and nearby communities.

The center is located in the West Village at 208 West 13th Street in Lower Manhattan, in a historic building which formerly housed an elementary school and the High School for Food Trades.

History

19th century 
The building was designed in the Italianate style, popular between the 1840s and 1870s, and erected by the City of New York. It was built prior to the Civil War in 1861; however, the date of the building's construction is unconfirmed. It is rumored that Abraham Lincoln once visited the building.

By 1867, it was in operation, known as "Grammar School No. 16 in the Ninth Ward." The city's Board of Education voted to repair the school's heaters that year. It was later called Public School 16.

In 1895, the school garnered a favorable review in Volume 7 of School magazine. The Evening version of the school was described as "most widely sought in this part of the city," in part because people wishing to apply needed either a recommendation from an employer or to bring their parents with them. The author credited the success of the school to Cecil A. Kidd, the school's principal.

By 1884, Kidd was principal of a Public School 184 in New York; as there are multiple P.S. 184s in New York currently, it is unclear which school he transferred to.

20th century 
In 1921, the condition of the building was poor, described in a civic group's Worst 40 list as having “plumbing wet and foul,” “rooms small, dirty and dingy,” and a need for ventilation “top to bottom.”

In 1938, it became the Food Trades Vocational High School and had 300 students training for various culinary careers including butchers, bakers, cafeteria workers, tea room hostesses, and store clerks.

In 1961, Eleanor Roosevelt visited the school, and it was renamed the Food and Maritime Trades School, allowing 800 students to be enrolled. Its attendees were primarily Black and Puerto Rican.

1983 to present 
In December 1983, the New York City Board of Estimates approved the sale of the former Food and Maritime Trades High School, located at 208 West 13th Street, to the Lesbian & Gay Community Services Center, Inc. for $1.5 million. In its first year, 60 groups met regularly at the center. Today, more than 300 groups call the center home.

Programs produced by the center include Center Wellness, an Adult Services Department working with people with AIDS, struggling with substance abuse issues, mental health challenges and much more; Youth Services, an activities-based program for LGBT youth; Center Cultural Programs, presenting established and emerging artists, writers, and activists to the community; Center Families, the center's family project.

The Pat Parker/Vito Russo Center Library is named in honor of individuals who championed LGBT causes in their professional and personal lives. The Center Library is a lending library connected with others around the city, sponsor of a monthly reading group, and producer and/or collaborator for literary events of interest to the LGBT community.

In 1985, the center became the temporary home to the Harvey Milk High School, a program of the Hetrick-Martin Institute. The Lesbian Switchboard became a permanent tenant after it was evicted from its former home, and Dignity, a Catholic gay and lesbian religious organization, sought refuge when it was expelled from Catholic churches.

The availability of meeting space was a major organizing tool for the LGBT movement in the 1980s and early 1990s. Groups that have expanded throughout the nation, such as the AIDS Coalition to Unleash Power (ACT UP), Queer Nation, Lesbian Avengers, and Gay & Lesbian Alliance Against Defamation (GLAAD), had their inception at the center. At one point in the early 1990s, the center was hosting regular meetings for more than three hundred groups.

Facilities and Activities 
Every week, 6,000 people visit the center, and more than 300 groups meet in the building. These groups range from political activist organizations to social clubs. The center also frequently hosts speeches, performances, workshops, and commercially sponsored information sessions.

Numerous Alcoholics Anonymous, Narcotics Anonymous, and other twelve-step recovery groups meet at the center. The center's Mental Health and Social Services division also sponsors support groups focused on coming out, transgender rights, bereavement, and other topics of concern to the LGBT community.

The center also houses Center Youth (previously called Y.E.S.), which provides support and resources for LGBTQ and allied youth. Programs such as both a young men's and a young women's discussion group, a gender exploration group, a safe schools network, a yearly summer camp and a variety of support groups are available to youth free of charge.

Recovery and Health
The center offers programs which care for the health and needs of the LGBT community. These programs include substance use treatments for adults and youths, recovery support, recovery resources, insurance enrollment, HIV & AIDS support, TGNC (trans and gender non-conforming) support, internships and professional training, and counseling and mental health.

Family and youth 
The center provides support for individuals and their families. Some of the services and programming of the center include building families, strengthening families, connecting families, family therapy certification, and family resources.

The center provides a range of events and services for individuals ages 13–21 such as dances, movie screenings, open mic night, summer camp and discussion groups. The programming and services are connection, leadership, support, and youth resources.

Israeli Apartheid Week controversy
In February 2011, the center became embroiled in a controversy over a pro-Palestinian group that was to have a party in the building on March 5 during "Israeli Apartheid Week". The group, Siegebusters, planned to train activists and raise funds for another vessel to break the Israeli naval blockade of Gaza.  Advocate columnist and porn producer Michael Lucas threatened a boycott, claiming that Israel is the only gay-friendly country in the Middle East, that the group was antisemitic, and that LGBT people in the Palestinian territories are tortured and killed. The center cancelled the party, stating that Siegebusters was not an LGBT-related group.  Siegebusters protested the decision by organizing an online petition; whereas Lucas hailed the decision in an interview with The Jerusalem Post.

In May 2011, the center announced that it would allow the group Queers Against Israeli Apartheid to meet in their building.  The Center defended the move, stating that it "provides space for a variety of LGBT voices in our community to engage in conversations on a range of topics."  At the beginning of June 2011, the Center decided to place a "moratorium" on renting space to "groups that organize around the Israeli-Palestinian conflict."

See also

List of LGBT community centers
LGBT culture in New York City

References

External links
 

 Stonewall Forever a Monument to 50 Years of Pride Stonewall Forever Monument

Organizations based in New York City
LGBT community centers in the United States
LGBT in New York (state)
LGBT organizations based in New York City
Organizations established in 1983
1983 in LGBT history
1983 establishments in New York City
LGBT culture in New York City